The In-Kraut: Hip Shaking Grooves Made in Germany 1966-1974 is the first volume in The In-Kraut series released by Marina Records on compact disc and double vinyl in 2005.

The album is a collection of obscuro German pop rarities, collected from various soundtracks and singles by artists who never intended to have their music released outside Germany.  It was followed by The In-Kraut, Vol. 2 in 2006.

Track listing
 "From Here On it Got Rough" (Hildegard Knef) – 2:38
 "Gemini" (Günter Noris) – 2:54
 "Marihuana Mantra" (Kuno & The Marihuana Brass) – 2:34
 "Why Don't You PLay The Organ, Man" (Memphis Black) – 2:38
 "An Unknown Quantity" (Bill Ramsey & The Jay Five) – 2:28
 "Sunday Love Affair" (Orchester Frank Pleyer) – 2:40
 "Wie A Glock'n..." (Marianne Mendt) – 2:51
 "Beat It" (Fredy Brock) – 3:06
 "Hippie Hippie" (France Gall) – 2:41
 "Jumpin' Jack Flash" (Peter Thomas Sound Orchestra) – 2:30
 "Berlin" (Heidi Brühl) – 3:11
 "Das Stundenhotel Von St. Pauli" (Erwin Halletz) – 1:33
 "Molotow Cocktail Party" (Vivi Bach & Dietmar Schönherr) – 2:32
 "Naturally Stoned" (Helmut Zacharias) – 2:31
 "Alexander" (The Boots) – 2:10
 "Bodybuilding" (Orchester Werner Müller) – 3:22
 "Jungle Soul" (Johannes Fehring & the ORF Big Band) – 2:50
 "Pussy Baby" (Bill Lawrence) – 2:54
 "Moving Out" (Orchester Helmuth Brandenburg) – 3:37
 "Undergroovin'" (Eugen Thomass) – 3:09

2005 compilation albums
Compilation albums by German artists